John Murillo is an American poet. He is a Cave Canem fellow and MacDowell fellow.

Life 
He grew up in Los Angeles to an African-American father and Mexican mother. He graduated from Howard University and New York University. He taught at Hampshire College and New York University. He teaches at Wesleyan University, and Sierra Nevada College.

Works

 Three Poems ReadingAB,
 VARIATION ON A THEME BY GIL SCOTT-HERON, The Los Angeles Review, 
 A REFUSAL TO MOURN THE DEATHS, BY GUNFIRE, OF THREE MEN IN BROOKLYN, American Poetry Review
 Up Jump the Boogie (Cypher, 2010) , 
 The Matador’s Ghost 
 Kontemporary Amerikan Poetry (Four Way Books, 2020) ,

References

External links
 The PEN Ten with John Murillo

American male poets
Living people
Year of birth missing (living people)
21st-century American poets
21st-century American male writers
American people of Mexican descent
African-American poets
Writers from Los Angeles
Poets from California
Howard University alumni
New York University alumni
Hampshire College faculty
New York University faculty
Wesleyan University faculty
Sierra Nevada College